Glucagon-like peptide-1 (GLP-1) is a 30- or 31-amino-acid-long peptide hormone deriving from the tissue-specific posttranslational processing of the proglucagon peptide. It is produced and secreted by intestinal enteroendocrine L-cells and certain neurons within the nucleus of the solitary tract in the brainstem upon food consumption. The initial product GLP-1 (1–37) is susceptible to amidation and proteolytic cleavage, which gives rise to the two truncated and equipotent biologically active forms, GLP-1 (7–36) amide and GLP-1 (7–37). Active GLP-1 protein secondary structure includes two α-helices from amino acid position 13–20 and 24–35 separated by a linker region.

Alongside glucose-dependent insulinotropic peptide (GIP), GLP-1 is an incretin; thus, it has the ability to decrease blood sugar levels in a glucose-dependent manner by enhancing the secretion of insulin. Beside the insulinotropic effects, GLP-1 has been associated with numerous regulatory and protective effects. Unlike GIP, the action of GLP-1 is preserved in patients with type 2 diabetes and substantial pharmaceutical research has therefore been directed towards the development of GLP-1-based treatment.

Endogenous GLP-1 is rapidly degraded primarily by dipeptidyl peptidase-4 (DPP-4), as well as neutral endopeptidase 24.11 (NEP 24.11) and renal clearance, resulting in a half-life of approximately 2 minutes. Consequently, only 10–15 % of GLP-1 reaches circulation intact, leading to fasting plasma levels of only 0–15 pmol/L. To overcome this, GLP-1 receptor agonists and DPP-4 inhibitors have been developed to increase GLP-1 activity. As opposed to common treatment agents such as insulin and sulphonylurea, GLP-1-based treatment has been associated with weight loss and a lower risk of hypoglycemia, two important considerations for patients with type 2 diabetes.

Gene expression

The proglucagon gene is expressed in several organs including the pancreas (α-cells of the islets of Langerhans), gut (intestinal enteroendocrine L-cells) and brain (caudal brainstem and hypothalamus). Pancreatic proglucagon gene expression is promoted upon fasting and hypoglycaemia induction and inhibited by insulin. Conversely, intestinal proglucagon gene expression is reduced during fasting and stimulated upon food consumption. In mammals, the transcription gives rise to identical mRNA in all three cell types, which is further translated to the 180 amino acid precursor called proglucagon. However, as a result of tissue-specific posttranslational processing mechanisms, different peptides are produced in the different cells.

In the pancreas (α-cells of the islets of Langerhans), proglucagon is cleaved by prohormone convertase (PC) 2 producing glicentin-related pancreatic peptide (GRPP), glucagon, intervening peptide-1 (IP-1) and major proglucagon fragment (MPGF).

In the gut and brain, proglucagon is catalysed by PC 1/3 giving rise to glicentin, which may be further processed to GRPP and oxyntomodulin, GLP-1, intervening peptide-2 (IP-2) and glucagon-like peptide-2 (GLP-2). Initially, GLP-1 was thought to correspond to proglucagon (72–108) suitable with the N-terminal of the MGPF, but sequencing experiments of endogenous GLP-1 revealed a structure corresponding to proglucagon (78–107) from which two discoveries were found. Firstly, the full-length GLP-1 (1–37) was found to be catalysed by endopeptidase to the biologically active GLP-1 (7–37). Secondly, the glycine corresponding to proglucagon(108) was found to serve as a substrate for amidation of the C-terminal arginine resulting in the equally potent GLP-1 (7–36) amide. In humans, almost all (>80%) secreted GLP-1 is amidated, whereas a considerable part remains GLP-1 (7–37) in other species.

Secretion

GLP-1 is packaged in secretory granules and secreted into the hepatic portal system by the intestinal L-cells located primarily in the distal ileum and colon, but also found in the jejunum and duodenum. The L-cells are open-type triangular epithelial cells directly in contact with the lumen and neuro-vascular tissue and are accordingly stimulated by various nutrient, neural and endocrine factors.

GLP-1 is released in a biphasic pattern with an early phase after 10–15 minutes followed by a longer second phase after 30–60 minutes upon meal ingestion. As the majority of L-cells are located in the distal ileum and colon, the early phase is likely explained by neural signalling, gut peptides or neurotransmitters. Other evidence suggest that the amount of L-cells located in the proximal jejunum is sufficient to account for the early phase secretion through direct contact with luminal nutrients. Less controversially, the second phase is likely caused by direct stimulation of L-cells by digested nutrients. The rate of gastric emptying is therefore an important aspect to consider, as it regulates the entry of nutrients into the small intestines where the direct stimulation occurs. One of the actions of GLP-1 is to inhibit gastric emptying, thus slowing down its own secretion upon postprandial activation.

Fasting plasma concentration of biologically active GLP-1 range between 0 and 15 pmol/L in humans and is increased 2- to 3-fold upon food consumption depending on meal size and nutrient composition. Individual nutrients, such as fatty acids, essential amino acids and dietary fibre have also shown to stimulate GLP-1 secretion.

Sugars have been associated with various signalling pathways, which initiate depolarisation of the L-cell membrane causing an elevated concentration of cytosolic Ca2+ which in turn induce GLP-1 secretion. Fatty acids have been associated with the mobilisation of intracellular Ca2+ stores and subsequently release of Ca2+ into the cytosol. The mechanisms of protein-triggered GLP-1 secretion are less clear, but the amino acid proportion and composition appear important to the stimulatory effect.

Degradation

Once secreted, GLP-1 is extremely susceptible to the catalytic activity of the proteolytic enzyme dipeptidyl peptidase-4 (DPP-4). Specifically, DPP-4 cleaves the peptide bond between Ala8-Glu9 resulting in the abundant GLP-1 (9–36) amide constituting 60–80 % of total GLP-1 in circulation. DPP-4 is widely expressed in multiple tissues and cell types and exists in both a membrane-anchored and soluble circulating form. Notably, DPP-4 is expressed on the surface of endothelial cells, including those located directly adjacent to GLP-1 secretion sites. Consequently, less than 25% of secreted GLP-1 is estimated to leave the gut intact. Additionally, presumably due to the high concentration of DPP-4 found on hepatocytes, 40–50% of the remaining active GLP-1 is degraded across the liver. Thus, due to the activity of DPP-4 only 10–15 % of secreted GLP-1 reaches circulation intact.

Neutral endopeptidase 24.11 (NEP 24.11) is a membrane-bound zinc metallopeptidase widely expressed in several tissues, but found in particularly high concentrations in the kidneys, which is also identified accountable for the rapid degradation of GLP-1. It primarily cleaves peptides at the N-terminal side of aromatic amino acids or hydrophobic amino acids and is estimated to contribute by up to 50% of the GLP-1 degradation. However, the activity only becomes apparent once the degradation of DPP-4 has been prevented, as the majority of GLP-1 reaching the kidneys have already been processed by DPP-4. Similarly, renal clearance appear more significant for the elimination of already inactivated GLP-1.

The resulting half-life of active GLP-1 is approximately 2 minutes, which is however sufficient to activate GLP-1 receptors.

Physiological functions

GLP-1 possesses several physiological properties making it (and its functional analogs) a subject of intensive investigation as a potential treatment of diabetes mellitus, as these actions induce long-term improvements along with the immediate effects. Although reduced GLP-1 secretion has previously been associated with attenuated incretin effect in patients with type 2 diabetes, it is now granted that GLP-1 secretion in patients with type 2 diabetes does not differ from healthy subjects.

The most noteworthy effect of GLP-1 is its ability to promote insulin secretion in a glucose-dependent manner. As GLP-1 binds to GLP-1 receptors expressed on the pancreatic β cells, the receptors couples to G-protein subunits and activates adenylate cyclase that increases the production of cAMP from ATP. Subsequently, activation of secondary pathways, including PKA and Epac2, alters the ion channel activity causing elevated levels of cytosolic Ca2+ that enhances exocytosis of insulin-containing granules. During the process, influx of glucose ensures sufficient ATP to sustain the stimulatory effect.

Additionally, GLP-1 ensures the β cell insulin stores are replenished to prevent exhaustion during secretion by promoting insulin gene transcription, mRNA stability and biosynthesis. GLP-1 evidently also increases β cell mass by promoting proliferation and neogenesis while inhibiting apoptosis. As both type 1 and 2 diabetes are associated with reduction of functional β cells, this effect is highly interesting regarding diabetes treatment. Considered almost as important as the effect of enhancing insulin secretion, GLP-1 has been shown to inhibit glucagon secretion at glucose levels above fasting levels. Critically, this does not affect the glucagon response to hypoglycemia as this effect is also glucose-dependent. The inhibitory effect is presumably mediated indirectly through somatostatin secretion, but a direct effect cannot be completely excluded.

In the brain, GLP-1 receptor activation has been linked with neurotrophic effects including neurogenesis and neuroprotective effects including reduced necrotic and apoptotic signaling, cell death, and dysfunctions. In the diseased brain, GLP-1 receptor agonist treatment is associated with protection against a range of experimental disease models such as Parkinson's disease, Alzheimer's disease, stroke, traumatic brain injury, and multiple sclerosis. In accordance with the expression of GLP-1 receptor on brainstem and hypothalamus, GLP-1 has been shown to promote satiety and thereby reduce food and water intake. Consequently, diabetic subjects treated with GLP-1 receptor agonists often experience weight loss as opposed to the weight gain commonly induced with other treatment agents.

In the stomach, GLP-1 inhibits gastric emptying, acid secretion and motility, which collectively decrease appetite. By decelerating gastric emptying GLP-1 reduces postprandial glucose excursion which is another attractive property regarding diabetes treatment. However, these gastrointestinal activities are also the reason why subjects treated with GLP-1-based agents occasionally experience nausea.

GLP-1 has also shown signs of carrying out protective and regulatory effects in numerous other tissues, including heart, tongue, adipose, muscles, bones, kidneys, liver and lungs.

See also 
 Glucagon-like peptide 1 receptor
 Glucagon-like peptide-2
 Type 2 diabetes
 GLP-1 analogs : exenatide, liraglutide, dulaglutide, semaglutide
 Dipeptidyl peptidase-4
 Glucose-dependent insulinotropic peptide

References

External links 
 
 
 Insulin release pathways

American diabetes association:link-http://diabetes.diabetesjournals.org/content/56/1/8.full

Anti-diabetic drugs
Diabetes
Peptide hormones